Dwayne Leik (born February 9, 1964) is a former NASCAR driver. He was formerly an owner of Leik Motorsports and a part-time driver in the NASCAR Nationwide Series. He formerly worked as the business manager for Marcis Racing and legendary NASCAR driver Dave Marcis. Leik was able to secure racing sponsorship for Marcis for eleven consecutive seasons and he is widely regarded as the key figure in resurrecting Marcis' faltering career. Since Marcis Racing did not have a test team, Leik's car was often seen as a test car for Marcis Racing. Leik also accompanied Marcis and participated in the IROC (International Race of Champions) test sessions. He has also served as a driving instructor at the Fast Track High Performance Driving School and Richard Petty Driving School.

Early racing career
He began his racing career with SCCA racing in Florida.  He is also a veteran of Late Model Stock divisions.

ARCA racing
In 13 career ARCA RE/MAX Series starts, Leik had 1 top 5, 2 top 10, 8 top 20 finishes. He finished 10th at Charlotte in his first ever ARCA race, with a best finish of 4th at Pococno.

NASCAR career
Leik purchased two NASCAR Nationwide series cars from Andy Petree Racing. Under funding and time limitations have always plagued his career.  Through his career he qualified and started in 14 NASCAR Nationwide Series races with his best finishes coming at Chicagoland Speedway where he finished 24th twice.  His Nationwide career earnings are 247,723.00.  One race of note that typifies his career is when he qualified a car for Davis Motorsports in 2008 at the biggest race of the year, Daytona, only to give up his starting spot to the owner’s son Kertus whose car did not make the race.  “This is a small father and son operation and they didn’t put in all of those long hours to watch me race one of their cars while Kertus sat out... It doesn’t matter to me if I qualified it; Kertus deserves to be in their own car... it’s the right thing."

In 2006, Leik partnered with Keith Duesenberg to form Duesenberg & Leik Motorsports.  The team ran the full 2006 NASCAR Nationwide season with driver Jay Sauter and sponsor Western Union.  In the year of the “Bushwhackers” (half the field being Sprint Cup drivers) the team posted 3 top 10, 6 top 15, and 13 top 20 finishes.  The team’s best qualifying efforts were 2nd at Martinsville, 6th at California and 7th at Richmond.  The team earned $751,219 in purse money.  Leik ran one race for the team – Daytona.

Winston Cup Series
Between 2000 and 2002, Leik attempted to qualify for four Winston Cup Series races, driving a No. 72 Chevrolet for Marcis Auto Racing in all attempts; he failed to qualify for any of the four races.

Business ventures
Leik is the owner of two NASCAR-related companies: Leik Motorsports, Inc., a NASCAR team and Motorsports Marketing, Inc., a NASCAR marketing company. He also owns Mobile Marketing Displays, Inc., a developer of mobile marketing exhibits, Leik Incorporated, a real estate holding company; Mountain Construction Company, Inc., a residential and commercial construction company, and Norman’s Ice Cream Service, Inc., a mobile ice cream business.

Personal life
Leik graduated from the University of Michigan.  He rowed on the university crew team for 4 years.  Post college, he continued to row and is a 3 time U.S. National Rowing Champion.

Motorsports career results

NASCAR
(key) (Bold – Pole position awarded by qualifying time. Italics – Pole position earned by points standings or practice time. * – Most laps led.)

Winston Cup Series

Daytona 500

Nationwide Series

Craftsman Truck Series

References

External links
 
 

Living people
1964 births
People from Buncombe County, North Carolina
Racing drivers from North Carolina
NASCAR drivers
ARCA Menards Series drivers
NASCAR team owners
University of Michigan alumni